Csömör is a village in the Gödöllő District in Pest county, Hungary. It lies in the Budapest metropolitan area, north of the 16th district of Budapest and west of Kistarcsa, on the western part of the Gödöllő hills, in the turning of the Csömör stream. It has a population of 9,971 (2020).

History

Ceramic pieces were found from the New Stone Age (3200–3000 BC) in the area of the Urasági-tag, the Bab-földek (bean fields) and the Rét-pótlék.

Ceramic pieces were found from the Bronze Age (1900–1800 BC) on the area of the Urasági-tag and the Szeder-völgyi-dűlő. On the 64 Erzsébet Street were found troves from the Vatyai Culture (1700–1400 BC).

A Celtic cemetery was dug out behind the strand, which is from the Iron Age (380–300 BC). Between the troves there are bracelets, fibulas, chiffons, a scabbard with sword, and chain.

During the third and the fourth century there was a Sarmatian village on the area of Csömör, both sides of the stream. During the explorations a Roman bowl (from the third century) and pottery were found.

Pieces of bowl were found on the area of the Réti-dűlős and Rétpótlék from the Avar age.

Ceramic pieces were found on the area of the Káposztáss and Réti-dűlős, that were made during the tenth and the eleventh century.

Memorial of communism's victims
In 2006 the Gloria Victis Memorial was created in honor of the casualties of universal communism: it is situated adjacent to the cemetery of the town.

Twin towns – sister cities

Csömör is twinned with:
 Mojmírovce, Slovakia
 Rimetea, Romania

References

External links

 in Hungarian

Budapest metropolitan area
Populated places in Pest County